The 20th Washington D.C. Area Film Critics Association Awards were announced on December 6, 2021. The nominations were announced on December 4, 2021. Belfast and The Power of the Dog led the nominations with 11 each, with the former winning Best Film.

Winners and nominees

Multiple nominations and wins

The following films received multiple nominations:

The following films received multiple awards:

References

External links
 The Washington D.C. Area Film Critics Association

2021
2021 film awards